Dolsin may refer to:

Dolsin, a drug
Dolcetto, a wine